The 2021–22 Colorado Buffaloes women's basketball team represented the University of Colorado Boulder during the 2021–22 NCAA Division I women's basketball season. The Buffaloes, led by sixth year head coach JR Payne, played their home games at the CU Events Center and competed as members of the Pac-12 Conference.

The Buffaloes were the last undefeated DI women's college basketball in the 2021-22 season, losing their first game to #2 Stanford on January 14, 2022.

Previous season 
The Buffaloes finished the season 12–11, 8–8 in Pac-12 play to finish in sixth place. As the sixth seed in the Pac-12 women's tournament they lost to Washington in the First Round.  They received an invitation to the WNIT where they defeated Louisiana in the first round and Nebraska in the second round before losing to Ole Miss in the quarterfinals.

Roster

Schedule

|-
!colspan=9 style=| Exhibition

|-
!colspan=9 style=| Regular season

|-
!colspan=9 style=| Pac-12 Women's Tournament

|-
!colspan=12 style=|NCAA tournament

Source:

Rankings
 

*The preseason and week 1 polls were the same.^Coaches did not release a week 2 poll.

Notes

References 

Colorado Buffaloes women's basketball seasons
Colorado
Colorado Buffaloes
Colorado Buffaloes
Colorado